Dendrophthora, the tree destroyers, is a genus of flowering plants in the sandalwood family Santalaceae, native to tropical and subtropical Latin America and the Caribbean. They are hemiparasitic mistletoes that grow on a wide variety of host plants.

Species
Currently accepted species include:

Dendrophthora albescens Urb. & Ekman
Dendrophthora amalfiensis Kuijt
Dendrophthora ambigua Kuijt
Dendrophthora arcuata C.Wright
Dendrophthora argentea Kuijt
Dendrophthora avenia (Trel.) Kuijt
Dendrophthora bermejae Kuijt, Carlo & Aukema
Dendrophthora bonaniae (Griseb.) Eichler
Dendrophthora brachylepis Urb.
Dendrophthora brachystachya Urb.
Dendrophthora bulbifera Kuijt
Dendrophthora buxifolia (Lam.) Eichler
Dendrophthora capillaris Kuijt
Dendrophthora capitellata Rizzini
Dendrophthora carnosa Urb. & Ekman
Dendrophthora chrysostachya (C.Presl) Urb.
Dendrophthora clavata (Benth.) Urb.
Dendrophthora confertiflora Krug & Urb.
Dendrophthora constricta (Griseb.) Eichler
Dendrophthora corynarthron (Eichler) Kuijt
Dendrophthora costaricensis Urb.
Dendrophthora crispula (Rizzini) Kuijt
Dendrophthora cryptantha Kuijt
Dendrophthora cubensis Eichler
Dendrophthora cuneifolia Kuijt
Dendrophthora cupressoides (Griseb.) Eichler
Dendrophthora cupulata (DC.) Eichler
Dendrophthora dalstroemii Kuijt
Dendrophthora davidsei Kuijt
Dendrophthora decipiens Kuijt
Dendrophthora densifolia Kuijt
Dendrophthora densifrons (Ule) Kuijt
Dendrophthora diffusa Kuijt
Dendrophthora dimorpha Kuijt
Dendrophthora dittae Urb. & Ekman
Dendrophthora dodsonii Kuijt
Dendrophthora domingensis (Spreng.) Eichler
Dendrophthora eichleriana Urb.
Dendrophthora elegantissima Kuijt
Dendrophthora elliptica (Gardner) Krug & Urb.
Dendrophthora enckeifolia (Rizzini) Kuijt
Dendrophthora epiviscum (Griseb.) Eichler
Dendrophthora equisetoides Kuijt
Dendrophthora erythrantha Kuijt
Dendrophthora excisa Urb.
Dendrophthora fanshawei (Maguire) Kuijt
Dendrophthora fasciculata Pacz.
Dendrophthora fastigiata Kuijt
Dendrophthora fendleriana (Eichler) Kuijt
Dendrophthora ferruginea Pacz.
Dendrophthora filiformis Rizzini
Dendrophthora flagelliformis (Lam.) Krug & Urb.
Dendrophthora fortis Kuijt
Dendrophthora glauca (C.Wright ex Griseb.) Eichler
Dendrophthora gracilipes Kuijt
Dendrophthora grandifolia Eichler
Dendrophthora haberi Kuijt
Dendrophthora harlingii Kuijt
Dendrophthora heterophylla (Rizzini) Kuijt
Dendrophthora hexasticha Tiegh.
Dendrophthora intermedia (Rizzini) Kuijt
Dendrophthora jauana Rizzini
Dendrophthora lamprophylla (Urb.) Urb.
Dendrophthora lanceifolia Urb.
Dendrophthora lanceolata Kuijt
Dendrophthora laxiflora Urb.
Dendrophthora leucocarpa (Pacz.) Trel.
Dendrophthora lindeniana Tiegh.
Dendrophthora linearifolia Pacz.
Dendrophthora longipedunculata Rizzini
Dendrophthora lueri Kuijt
Dendrophthora macbridei (Standl.) Kuijt
Dendrophthora macrostachyos (Jacq.) Eichler
Dendrophthora mancinellae (C.Wright ex Griseb.) Eichler
Dendrophthora marmeladensis Urb.
Dendrophthora meridana Kuijt
Dendrophthora mesembrianthemifolia Urb.
Dendrophthora mexicana Kuijt
Dendrophthora microphylla Kuijt
Dendrophthora microsoma Rizzini
Dendrophthora mirandensis Kuijt
Dendrophthora mornicola Urb.
Dendrophthora negeriana Pacz.
Dendrophthora nitidula (Rizzini) Kuijt
Dendrophthora nodosa Pacz.
Dendrophthora nuda Proctor
Dendrophthora obliqua (C.Presl) Wiens
Dendrophthora oligantha Kuijt
Dendrophthora opuntioides (L.) Eichler
Dendrophthora ovata Kuijt
Dendrophthora palaeformis Kuijt
Dendrophthora panamensis Kuijt
Dendrophthora paucifolia (Rusby) Kuijt
Dendrophthora pavonii Tiegh.
Dendrophthora pearcei (Rusby) Kuijt
Dendrophthora perfurcata (Rizzini) Kuijt
Dendrophthora perlicarpa Kuijt
Dendrophthora peruviana Kuijt
Dendrophthora polyantha Kuijt
Dendrophthora primaria Kuijt
Dendrophthora purpurea Kuijt
Dendrophthora ramosa Pacz.
Dendrophthora remotiflora Urb.
Dendrophthora roraimae (Oliv.) Ule
Dendrophthora roseantha Kuijt
Dendrophthora rotundata Kuijt
Dendrophthora scopulata Kuijt
Dendrophthora serpyllifolia (Griseb.) Krug & Urb.
Dendrophthora sessilifolia (Griseb.) Krug & Urb.
Dendrophthora solomonis Kuijt
Dendrophthora squamigera (Benth.) Benth. & Hook.f. ex Kuntze
Dendrophthora steyermarkii Rizzini
Dendrophthora stricta Rusby
Dendrophthora subsessilis Kuijt
Dendrophthora subtrinervis Urb.
Dendrophthora sulcata Kuijt
Dendrophthora sumacoi Kuijt
Dendrophthora talamancana Kuijt
Dendrophthora tenuiflora (Steyerm. & Maguire) Kuijt
Dendrophthora tenuifolia Kuijt
Dendrophthora tenuis Kuijt
Dendrophthora terminalis Kuijt
Dendrophthora ternata Urb.
Dendrophthora tetrastachya (Griseb.) Urb.
Dendrophthora thomasii Kuijt
Dendrophthora turrialbae Kuijt
Dendrophthora urbaniana Pacz.
Dendrophthora variabilis Kuijt
Dendrophthora verrucosa Kuijt
Dendrophthora virgata (Trel.) Kuijt
Dendrophthora warmingii (Eichler) Kuijt
Dendrophthora werffii Kuijt

References

Santalaceae